is a Japanese politician serving in the House of Representatives in the Diet (national legislature) as a member of the New Komeito Party. A native of Ōta, Tokyo and graduate of Soka University he was elected for the first time in 1993 after working at the national newspaper Mainichi Shimbun for 7 years.

He was one of the chief guests for the Andhra Pradesh state capital, Amaravati's official foundation ceremony. His speech got wonderful applause from crowd. Later his name was written on the Amaravati foundation plaque and hence became a great official from Japan to achieve such an honor.

References

External links
 Official website in Japanese.

Living people
1959 births
People from Ōta, Tokyo
New Komeito politicians
Members of the House of Representatives (Japan)
21st-century Japanese politicians